Parliamentary elections were held in Cyprus on 24 May 1981. AKEL and the Democratic Rally both won 12 of the 35 seats. Voter turnout was 95.7%.

Results

References

1981 in Cyprus
Cyprus
Legislative elections in Cyprus
May 1981 events in Europe